

The Agusta GA.140/V is a 4-cylinder, air-cooled, horizontally opposed engine mounted vertically, developed in Italy for helicopter use and produced from 1962 to 1969.

Specifications (G.A.140/V)

Applications
 Agusta A.104

Notes

References

 Erickson, Jack. Horizontally-Opposed Piston Aero Engines

1960s aircraft piston engines
Boxer engines
Agusta aircraft engines